Noemie Thomas (born February 4, 1996) is a Canadian swimmer who competes in the women's butterfly competitions. She holds the Canadian national record in the butterfly over the 50 m in the short course. Thomas also holds the Canadian junior butterfly record in the 100 m.

Background
Thomas started swimming lessons at age five and her first swim club was the Richmond Kigoos.

Career
The Richmond, B.C., native made a big splash at the 2012 Junior Pan Pacific Swimming Championships in August in Hawaii. She took gold in the 100-metre butterfly, silver in the 4x100-m medley relay and finished fourth in the 200-m fly.

Noemie Thomas had her senior international coming-out party at the 2012 FINA World Swimming Championships (25 m), held in December. She set and then beat her own Canadian record in the 50-m butterfly at the world short-course meet, finishing fourth by just 0.05 seconds in the final. She followed up by establishing a new national mark in the 100-m fly and once again finished just outside the medals in fourth.

Success continued to follow her in 2013, capped by a seventh-place finish in the 100-m butterfly at the 2013 FINA World Championships in Barcelona. She earned Swimming Canada’s 2013 Junior Female Swimmer of the Year award for her performance. She and Katerine Savard give Canada a pair of medal threats in the event.

In 2016, she was officially named to Canada's Olympic team for the 2016 Summer Olympics.

Results 
 4th place, 2012 FINA World Swimming Championships (25 m), 50 m butterfly.
 4th place, 2012 FINA World Swimming Championships (25 m), 100 m butterfly.
 7th place, 2013 FINA World Championships (long course), 100 m butterfly.

Personal best times

Long course

Short course

References

External links 
 
 
 
 
 

1996 births
Living people
Canadian female butterfly swimmers
People from Richmond, British Columbia
Sportspeople from British Columbia
Swimmers at the 2015 Pan American Games
Pan American Games silver medalists for Canada
Swimmers at the 2016 Summer Olympics
Olympic swimmers of Canada
Pan American Games medalists in swimming
Medalists at the 2015 Pan American Games
21st-century Canadian women